Walter J. Opekun (January 16, 1905 - December 18, 1997) was an American football, basketball and baseball coach. He served as the head football coach at Mount St. Mary's University in Emmitsburg, Maryland from 1942 to 1946. Opekun was also the head basketball coach and head baseball coach at Mount St. Mary's. He played college football  as a  fullback at the University of Pennsylvania.

References

1905 births
1997 deaths
American football fullbacks
Mount St. Mary's Mountaineers baseball coaches
Mount St. Mary's Mountaineers football coaches
Mount St. Mary's Mountaineers men's basketball coaches
Penn Quakers football players